The Sun Belt Conference men's basketball tournament has been played every year since the formation of the Sun Belt Conference for the 1976–77 academic year.

The winner of the tournament is guaranteed an automatic berth into the NCAA Division I men's basketball tournament.

History

Format
The size and format of the Sun Belt tournament has varied widely since its establishment in 1976. The size of the conference has ranged between a minimum of six teams and as many as thirteen.

Nonetheless, the tournament has consistently utilized a simple single-elimination style tournament. Through the 2018 edition of the tournament, with a few exceptions, all conference members were typically invited to each tournament. Depending on the total number of teams in the league during a particular year, higher-seeded teams have sometimes received byes into the quarterfinal or semifinal rounds. Teams have always been seeded based on regular season conference records, although some modifications were made when the league was split into divisions during the 2000s.

During the 2018 offseason, the conference announced radical changes to its basketball scheduling and tournament format. A year later, many of these changes were reevaluated and placed on hold; the ones listed here remained in place.
 Effective with the 2019 edition forward, only 10 of the conference's 12 teams qualified for the tournament.
 The format consisted of two stepladder-style brackets. The bottom four seeds played in the first round; the 5 and 6 seeds received byes into the second round; the 3 and 4 seeds began play in the quarterfinals, and the top two seeds received a triple bye into the semifinals.
 In 2019, the bottom four seeds played first-round games at campus sites, hosted by the higher seed. The winners then joined the top six teams at Lakefront Arena.
 Starting in 2020, all games prior to the semifinals will be at campus sites, again hosted by the higher seeds. The semifinals and finals remained in New Orleans, but moved to the Smoothie King Center.

On March 3, 2020, the conference announced that it had reached an agreement for Pensacola, Florida to host the men's and women's tournaments from 2021 to 2025. During that time, the tournament will completely abandon the use of campus sites and return to a format that features all conference members. First- and second-round games will be played simultaneously at Hartsell Arena on the campus of Pensacola State College and the Pensacola Bay Center, with semifinals and finals at the Bay Center.

Hosts
With some exceptions, the tournament has historically been played at the home gym of one of the conference's members (e.g. Louisiana's Cajundome, North Texas' UNT Coliseum) or at a major arena in a nearby city (e.g. Mobile Civic Center near South Alabama).

Some of the more common host venues have included the Charlotte Coliseum in Charlotte, North Carolina (Charlotte), the venue now known as Legacy Arena in Birmingham, Alabama (UAB), Barton Coliseum in Little Rock, Arkansas (Little Rock), and E.A. Diddle Arena in Bowling Green, Kentucky (Western Kentucky).

However, the tournament has been hosted at a neutral arena site each year since 2009 (Hot Springs, Arkansas, New Orleans, Louisiana, and Pensacola, Florida). Lakefront Arena in New Orleans had previously hosted the event in 2002 when UNO was still a Sun Belt member, but the Privateers have since departed the conference. The only other neutral sites to host a Sun Belt tournament were the Hampton Coliseum in Hampton, Virginia (1985) and the Mississippi Coast Coliseum in Biloxi, Mississippi (1992–1993).

NCAA performances
The Sun Belt has a storied basketball history, sending multiple teams into the NCAA tournament in the 1980s and 1990s (most recently 1994), and then again in 2008 when both regular season champion South Alabama, and tournament winner Western Kentucky received bids, and in 2013 with Western Kentucky and Middle Tennessee.

Charlotte, then known athletically as UNC Charlotte, reached the Final Four in 1977, and future Sun Belt member Western Kentucky reached the Final Four in 1971.  Overall, past and present Sun Belt schools have posted 21 wins in the NCAA Tournament during the time they were conference members.

Champions by year

Notes
 The University of Louisiana at Lafayette was known as Southwestern Louisiana prior to the 1999–2000 season. The school now brands its athletic program solely as Louisiana, with no city identifier.
 The University of Arkansas at Little Rock changed its athletic branding to Little Rock starting with the 2015–16 school year.

Performance by school

Teams in bold represent current conference members as of the 2022–23 season

See also
Sun Belt Conference women's basketball tournament

Broadcasters

Television

Radio

References

 
Recurring sporting events established in 1977